Pasvisheh (also Romanized as Pasvīsheh; also known as Paspīsheh, Pasvīshad, and Pūysheh) is a village in Pasikhan Rural District, in the Central District of Rasht County, Gilan Province, Iran. At the 2006 census, its population was 658, in 169 families.

References 

Populated places in Rasht County